Cornelis Joseph Maria Melief (born 20 January 1943) is a globally recognised immunology expert  specialising in cancer immunology and immunotherapy, with special focus on therapeutic cancer vaccines. He is Emeritus Professor, former head of the Department of Immunohematology and Blood Transfusion at the Leiden University Medical Center, and Chief Scientific Officer at ISA Therapeutics in Netherlands. He is known for his work in the field of cancer immunology, devising new cancer therapies based on the activation of the patient’s own immune system.

Early life and education 

He grew up in the South of the Netherlands, in the town of Zevenbergschenhoek and from 11 years of age onwards in Amsterdam. He received his PhD Doctorate in Medicine in 1967 from the University of Amsterdam, followed by a Medical Doctor degree in 1970 from the same University. In 1973 and 1974 he was a postdoctoral fellow at the New England Medical Center and Dana-Farber Cancer Institute in Boston.

From 1970-1972, Melief served as a MD Lieutenant as part of compulsory Conscription in the Netherlands.

Career 
In 1975, he joined the Netherlands Red Cross Blood Transfusion Service, as Head of Department of cell-mediated immunology. From 1975-1985 he became a scientific staff member of the CLB Amsterdam. In 1976, Melief was made head of the new Department of Experimental Tumour Immunology which in 1982 was renamed the Department of Cellular Immunology.

From 1985-1991, he worked as the Head of the Division of Immunology at the Netherlands Cancer Institute in Amsterdam. In 1991, he became head of the Department of Immunohematology and blood transfusion at Leiden University Medical Center. In 2004 he co-founded and became Chief Scientific Officer at the Biotech company Immune System Activation (ISA) Pharmaceuticals 

Since 2012, Melief has been the CSO of ISA Pharmaceuticals and Emeritus Professor at Leiden University Medical Center.

Awards and recognitions

Major accomplishments 
He is author of more than 545 peer-reviewed publications, cited over 67,000 times  and inventor on more than 30 patents and patent applications.

Major patents include:

 2003- Induction of anti-tumor CTL immunity through in vivo triggering of 4-1BB and/or CD40
 2007 - Long peptides of 22-45 amino acid residues that induce and/or enhance antigen specific immune responses
 1998 - Published T-cell help for cytotoxic T lymphocytes is mediated by CD40–CD40L interactions which was a breakthrough in the understanding of the importance of T-cells in priming cytotoxic T lymphocytes.
 2014 - Checkpoint blockade cancer immunotherapy targets tumour-specific mutant antigens

Memberships 

 Member of the Research Council of the Dutch Kidney Foundation from 1983 to 1987.
 Member of the Executive Board of the Foundation for Medical Research (Medigon) in the Netherlands from 1980 to 1988.
 Member of the program committee on AIDS research of the advisory board on health research in the Netherland from 1988 to 1992.
 Member of the research council of the Dutch Cancer Society from 1990 to 1996.
 Board Member of Stichting Bloedbank Leidsenhage (The Hague, Leiden) from 1991 to present.
 Chairman of the Board of the Amsterdam-Leiden Institute for Immunology (ALIFI) from 1992 to 1998.
 Chairman of NWO (Netherlands Organisation for Scientific Research) Immunology and Infectious Diseases Committee from 1994 to 1997.
 Member of ECOS (Erkenningscommissie Onderzoeksscholen), Supervisory Body of Graduate Schools in The Netherlands from 1996 to 2004.
 Member of the Scientific Advisory Board of the Danish Cancer Institute from 1996 to 2006.
 Member of the Commissie Geneeskunde (Medicine) of the Royal Netherlands Academy of Arts and Sciences from 1997 to 2004.
 Member of the Scientific Advisory Board of Cancer Vaccines at Aventis-Pasteur from 1998 to 2007.
 Member of the Scientific Advisory Board of German Pharmaceutical Company Medigene from 1999 to 2005.
 Member of the Scientific Advisory Board of the Danish Cancer Institute in Denmark and the Jenner Vaccine Institute in England from 2000 to 2005.
 Member of the Scientific Advisory Board of Swedish Immunotherapy Company Accuro from 2000 to 2005.
 Chairman of the Dutch Society for Immunology from 2001 to 2008.
 Member of the Scientific Advisory Board of German Biotech Company Immatics from 2003 to 2020.
 Member of the AACR Immunology Advisory Committee from 2005 to 2011.
 Board Member of Lorentz-van Iterson Foundation of TNO from 2008 to 2014.
 Member of the Scientific Advisory Board for the Centre for Human Drug Research (CHDR) in Leiden from 2008 to present.
 Member of the Scientific Advisory Board of the Comprehensive Cancer Centre of the University of Dresden from 2009 to present.
 Advisory Board Member of the Ministry of Health (Germany) from 2009 to present.
 Board Member of the Cellular Immunotherapy (CIMT) organisation based in Mainz, Germany from 2010 to present.
 Chairman of the Scientific Advisory Board of TRON (Translational Oncology), a not-for-profit organisation of the University of Mainz, Germany, from 2011 to present.
 Board Member of the Society for Immunotherapy of Cancer (SITC) from 2013 to 2015.
 Member of the Scientific Advisory Board of NCT, a Translational and Clinical Oncology Center of excellence of the German Cancer Institute (Deutsches Krebs Forschungs Zentrum) in Heidelberg and the Comprehensive Cancer Center of University of Dresden from 2015 to present.
 Member of the American Association for Cancer Research

 Member of the Royal Dutch Academy of Arts and Sciences (KNAW)

 Member of the Hollandsche Maatschappij van Wetenschappen
 Member of the European Foundation for Immunogenetics
 Council Member of European Association for Cancer Research (EACR)
 Member of New York Academy of Sciences
 Member of European Society of Medical Oncology (ESMO)
 Member of European Academy of Cancer Immunology
 Member of European Research Institute for Integrated Cellular Pathology (ERI-ICP)

Awards and honours 

 Member of the Royal Netherlands Academy of Arts and Sciences
 SOFI Prize Leiden in 1986
 AkzoNobel Prize in 1995
 European Federation of Immunological Societies Lecture Award in 2007
 Ceppellini Lecture from the European Society of Immunogenetics in 2009 (as Cees Melief)
 William B. Coley Award from the Cancer Research Institute in 2009
 Queen Wilhelmina Research Prize from the Dutch Cancer Society in 2010
 Cancer Immunotherapy (CIMT) organization, Mainz Germany. Lifetime Achievement Award 2017
 Honorary doctorate Mainz University, Germany, 2017
 2018 ESMO Immuno-Oncology Award in recognition of his work studying the interactions of the immune system with cancer
 2019 AACR-CRI Lloyd J. Old Award in Cancer Immunology

References 

1943 births
Living people
University of Amsterdam alumni
Members of the Royal Netherlands Academy of Arts and Sciences
Dutch immunologists
Academic staff of Leiden University
Dutch company founders